Scott Stricklin (born February 17, 1972) is an American college baseball coach, the head coach of the Georgia Bulldogs baseball team since the start of the 2014 season.  Stricklin was the head coach at Kent State from 2005–2013.  Before serving as Kent State's head coach, Stricklin played for Kent State from 1991–1993 and played minor league baseball from 1993–1997.  He began his coaching career as a volunteer assistant under former Kent State head coach Danny Hall at Georgia Tech from 1998–1999.  In 2000–2001, he served as an assistant at Vanderbilt, and he returned to Georgia Tech as an assistant from 2002–2004.

Coaching career

Kent State
As the head coach of Kent State, Scott Stricklin head coaching record was 350–188.  Under him, Kent State won five Mid-American Conference Baseball Tournament Championships, reaching the NCAA Regionals in each of those seasons.  The team also reached one Super Regional, in 2012.  After defeating Oregon in that Super Regional, the team advanced to the 2012 College World Series.  Stricklin won three Mid-American Conference Coach of the Year Awards and one ABCA Mideast Region Coach of the Year Award.

Following Kent State's performance in the 2012 postseason, several news outlets, including the Detroit News, speculated that Michigan was interested in hiring Stricklin to replace former head coach Rich Maloney, whose contract was not extended at the end of the 2012 season.  Stricklin later confirmed that Michigan had contacted him, but that he elected to stay at Kent State.  Michigan instead hired then-Maryland head coach Erik Bakich.

Georgia
Following the 2013 season, Stricklin was hired to replace David Perno as the head coach of Georgia.

Head coaching record
Below is a table of Stricklin's yearly records as an NCAA head baseball coach.

See also
List of current NCAA Division I baseball coaches

References

1972 births
Living people
Georgia Bulldogs baseball coaches
Georgia Tech Yellow Jackets baseball coaches
Kent State Golden Flashes baseball coaches
Kent State Golden Flashes baseball players
Vanderbilt Commodores baseball coaches
Baseball coaches from Ohio
People from Athens, Ohio